Paschasius is a masculine given name. It may refer to:

Paschasius, villain in the legend of Saint Lucy (late 3rd century)
Paschasius of Vienne (fl. 4th century), bishop of Vienne
Paschasius (d. 437), advisor of the Vandal king and martyr alongside Arcadius and companions
Paschasius of Rome (d. 512), Roman deacon and writer
Paschasius (fl. 533), Roman praefectus annonae
Paschasius of Dumium (fl. c. 555), Galician monk and translator
Paschasius Radbertus (d. 865), Frankish monk and scholar
Paschasius, Bishop of Nyitra (fl. 1280–1297), Hungarian prelate